A chartered company is an association with investors or shareholders that is incorporated and granted rights (often exclusive rights) by royal charter (or similar instrument of government) for the purpose of trade, exploration, and/or colonization.

Notable chartered companies (with years of formation)

Austrian

British

The article Chartered Companies in the Encyclopædia Britannica Eleventh Edition, by William Bartleet Duffield, contains a detailed narrative description of the development of some of the companies in England and, later, Britain.

Dutch

English

French

German

Polish-Lithuanian

Portuguese

Russian
1799–1867 Russian-American Company

Scandinavian

Scottish

Spanish

Italian
From 3 August 1889 to 15 May 1893 Filonardi was the first Governor of Italian Somaliland and was in charge of an Italian company responsible for the administration of the Benadir territory, called Societa' Filonardi.

1889 – 1893 Filonardi Company

Zionist Aspiration

Theodor Herzl, the founder of Political Zionism, aspired to create a "Jewish Charter Company", modeled on the above European precedents, which would lease Palestine from the Ottoman Empire and exercise there a de facto  sovereign power - a plan described in great detail in Herzl's books Der Judenstaat and Altneuland. In practice Herzl and his successors never managed to mobilize the political and financial backing needed for setting up such a company, and the Zionist Movement eventually established the State of Israel by different means.

Gallery

See also 
 American Colonization Society
 Articles of association
 Articles of incorporation
 Articles of organization
 British colonisation of the Americas
 Certificate of incorporation
 Charter
 Collegium
 Congressional charter
 Government-sponsored enterprise
 Hong (business)
 South Manchuria Railway and Chinese Eastern Railway

Notes

References

Bibliography

External links 

Chartered companies
Colonial flags of Mozambique
Hudson's Bay Company
WorldStatesmen

 
History of European colonialism
British Empire
Former Dutch colonies
Former Danish colonies
Former French colonies
Former German colonies
Former Swedish colonies
Types of business entity
History of corporate law
Age of Sail